The Boxing Tournament at the 1990 Asian Games was held in Beijing Institute of Physical Education, Beijing, China from September 25 to October 3, 1990.

South Korea finished first in medal table by winning five gold medals. Thailand was second with two gold medals, China, Pakistan, Philippines, Indonesia and Syria won the remaining gold medals.

Medalists

Medal table

References
Amateur Boxing

External links
 Olympic Council of Asia

 
1990 Asian Games events
1990
Asian Games
1990 Asian Games